The 1998 PBA All Filipino Cup Finals was the best-of-7 basketball championship series of the 1998 PBA All-Filipino Cup, and the conclusion of the conference's playoffs. The Alaska Milkmen and San Miguel Beermen played for the 69th championship contested by the league as the country celebrates its centennial year. The champion for this finals series were awarded with two different trophies; the regular All-Filipino Cup trophy and the FVR Centennial Cup trophy.

The Alaska Milkmen regain the All-Filipino Cup crown with a 4–3 series victory against the San Miguel Beermen and repeated as back-to-back champions, winning their 8th PBA title.

Kenneth Duremdes won on his first Finals MVP in All-Filipino Cup Finals.

Qualification

Series scoring summary

Games summary

Game 1

The Beer took a 10-point lead in the first period, the Alaska Milkmen came back and narrowed the gap in the third period at 50–54. The San Miguel team recovered as they relied mostly on clutch baskets from their key players.

Game 2

Game 3

San Miguel forward Art Dela Cruz was fined P12,000 when he threw the ball at Alaska center Poch Juinio and punch him in the face in a near scuffle, Juinio was fined P5,000 when he elbowed Dela Cruz in the neck, both were spared from suspension by the Commissioner's office

Game 4

Alaska controlled the game for most of the way but the Beer rallied in the final minute, a triple by Mike Mustre gave San Miguel a 92–88 edge. Beer forward Nelson Asaytono poured in 40 points for the night.

Game 5

San Miguel's Nelson Asaytono scored 41 points and pumped in nine points in the extension period and made up for the scoreless performances of Mike Mustre and Allan Caidic plus the absence of Art Dela Cruz serving a one-game suspension for elbowing Poch Juinio in the face in Game four. Regulation ended at 66-all.

Game 6

Alaska was up by 16 points, 28–12 at the end of the first quarter. The Milkmen raced to a 59–35 lead in the third period, Allan Caidic's triple keyed a 10–0 uprising by the Beer to cut the deficit to 14 points but Kenneth Duremdes, playing one of his best games, completed a steal off Allan Caidic and a feed to Bong Hawkins, who scored a buzzer-beating lay-up gave the Milkmen a 63–45 lead going into the final quarter. Alaska's 38-point winning margin was the most lopsided win in PBA finals history.

Game 7

The Milkmen got off to a sizzling start but the Beer worked their way back and close in, 31–32 at the break, behind the big triple by Nelson Asaytono. San Miguel last tasted the lead at 41–39. From a 43-all count, a 9–0 run by the Milkmen gave them a 52–43 lead going into the final quarter. Alaska was protecting a 10-point lead, 64–54, when the Beer battled back with seven straight points anchored on a three-point play from Nelson Asaytono and a jumper by rookie Danny Ildefonso to close the gap, 61–64, entering the final two minutes. Two crucial errors by Asaytono where he lost the ball twice and a clutch basket by Alaska's Johnny Abarrientos sealed the outcome at 70–63. Kenneth Duremdes won on his first Finals MVP and Alaska captures on his eighth championship title.

Rosters

Broadcast notes

References

External links
PBA official website

1998 PBA season
1998
San Miguel Beermen games
Alaska Aces (PBA) games
PBA All-Filipino Cup Finals
PBA All-Filipino Cup Finals